Shushandukht ( <šyšyntwḥt|> Šīšīntūḥt; New Persian:  Šušanduxt) was the wife of Yazdegerd I and mother of Bahram V. She was the daughter of a Jewish exilarch, Huna bar Nathan. She created the Jewish neighborhood in the city of Isfahan. She also established Jewish colonies in the cities of Shush (Susa) and Shooshtar. The existence of a Jewish queen enhanced the life of Persian Jews and during this period Jewish exilarchs had regular attendance to the Shah's court. The Iranologist Ernst Herzfeld (1879–1948) speculated that the tomb of Esther and Mordechai in the city of Hamedan might be the tomb of Shushandukht.

In The Provincial Capitals of The Iranian Empire 
The Provincial Capitals of The Iranian Empire (Middle Persian: Šahrestānīhā ī Ērānšahr) is a late 8th century Middle Persian book that mentions Shushandukht as founder of Shush (Susa) and Shooshtar:

The book also mentions Narseh the son of the Jewish woman (who was probably Shushandukht) who founded Khwarezm.

References

Further reading 
 

Year of birth missing
Year of death missing
Sasanian queens
5th-century Iranian people
5th-century women
Jews in the Sasanian Empire
Jewish royalty